The following is a list of tourist attractions in the Myrtle Beach, South Carolina area.

Current Attractions
Barefoot Landing, a large shopping complex located in North Myrtle Beach. Opened 1988.
Alabama Theatre, a public theatre. 1993
House of Blues, a live concert music hall. 1997
Broadway at the Beach, a large entertainment complex and shopping mall. 1995
Jimmy Buffett's Margaritaville, a themed restaurant. 2004
Hard Rock Cafe, opened in 1995 (was formerly in a pyramid with sphinxes until 2016 when it moved to a new location)
Ripley's Aquarium
WonderWorks, an entertainment center. 2011 (1 of 5 in the U.S.)
Brookgreen Gardens, sculpture garden in Murrells Inlet. 1932
The Carolina Opry, a music variety theater. 1993
Coastal Grand Mall, a large shopping mall. 2004
Family Kingdom Amusement Park, an oceanfront amusement park 1966. and Splashes Oceanfront Water Park 1977
Gay Dolphin Gift Cove, billed as the nation's largest gift shop. 1954
Hollywood Wax Museum Myrtle Beach, an entertainment center featuring replicas and interactive displays of celebrities. 2014
Legends In Concert, featuring live concerts paying tribute to musical icons of the past and present. 2010
Market Common, a shopping district and lifestyle center. 2008
Medieval Times, a Medieval-themed dinner theater located behind the former Freestyle Music Park. 1995
Myrtle Beach Boardwalk, a boardwalk and oceanfront promenade. 2010 
Myrtle Beach Mall, a shopping mall located in Briarcliffe Acres. 1986
Myrtle Beach SkyWheel, a large oceanfront Ferris wheel. 2011
Myrtle Beach Speedway, a small racetrack. 1958
Myrtle Beach State Park, a small state park which consists miles of forest that stretch along the Atlantic Ocean. 1935
Myrtle Waves, a large water park. 1985
Pirates Voyage, a pirate-themed dinner theater operated by Dolly Parton's Dixie Stampede, located next to The Carolina Opry. 2010
Ripley's Believe It or Not!, a themed museum
Ripley's Haunted Adventure
TicketReturn.com Field, a baseball field home to the Myrtle Beach Pelicans. 1999
Topgolf, a sports entertainment facility. 2019

Former attractions
Freestyle Music Park (formerly Hard Rock Park), a music theme park (opened 2008 [with a concert by the Eagles and The Moody Blues]-closed in Sept. 2009).
MagiQuest, a live action role-playing game establishment (2005-closed 2015).
Myrtle Beach Pavilion an amusement park that was located in the "heart" of Myrtle Beach (1948-closed Sept. 30, 2006).
Planet Hollywood, a movie themed restaurant (with mostly 90s movies memorabilia) (opened in 1996 with stars Bruce Willis, Will Smith, and Jennifer Love Hewitt-closed Sept. 8, 2015).
Official All Star Café, sports themed restaurant in the 90s (building now houses Legends in Concert)
Waccamaw Pottery, a shopping center (1977-closed in 2001).

References

 
Myrtle Beach
Myrtle Beach, Attractions